Francisco Medina Luna (born 26 May 1981), known as Piti, is a Spanish former professional footballer who played as a winger or a forward.

His name was mostly associated with Rayo Vallecano where he had three spells, and achieved La Liga totals of 148 games and 29 goals for that club, Zaragoza and Granada. He amassed 164 appearances and 34 goals in the Segunda División for Ciudad de Murcia, Hércules and Rayo, and spent several years of his later career in Cyprus, Greece and India.

Club career
Born in Reus, Tarragona, Catalonia, Piti was signed by Real Zaragoza in 2004 after playing almost exclusively in amateur football, notably scoring 22 goals for CF Reus Deportiu in the Tercera División. During his spell in Aragon, however, he was mainly registered with the reserves – he appeared in three La Liga games, totalling 34 minutes– also being loaned to Ciudad de Murcia of Segunda División for the 2005–06 season.

Piti joined second-division club Hércules CF in the summer of 2006 but, in January of the following year, he moved to Rayo Vallecano of Segunda División B on loan. After featuring rarely for the Valencians in the first half of the 2007–08 campaign, he returned to Rayo and helped the Madrid outskirts team to return to division two, scoring seven times in 21 matches.

In the following second-tier seasons, Piti remained an important attacking player for Rayo Vallecano. In 2010–11 he contributed nine goals (second-best in the squad, tied with Óscar Trejo) as the side returned to the top flight after an eight-year absence.

Piti came of age in 2012–13 at the age of 31, scoring 18 goals from 35 appearances, only five through penalties as Rayo posted their best season in the top division. Highlights included braces at Málaga CF (2–1) and Levante UD (3–2 win), and at home against Getafe CF (3–1).

In the following years, Piti represented Granada CF and (again) Rayo, always in the main tier. On 3 January 2017 the 35-year-old moved abroad for the first time in his career, joining Cypriot First Division club AEL Limassol until 30 June.

On 29 July 2017, PAS Lamia 1964 announced the signing of Piti. On 16 July 2018 he joined Athlitiki Enosi Larissa F.C. also of the Super League Greece for an undisclosed fee but, six months later, returned to his previous team.

In October 2020, following a short spell in the Indian Super League with Jamshedpur FC, Piti returned to his homeland to act as player and part-owner of amateurs CA Pinto. He worked as Lamia's technical director after retiring, leaving the position on 21 February 2022.

International career
Uncapped by Spain at any level, Piti represented the non-FIFA Catalonia side. On 24 May 2006, he scored in a 2–0 win against Costa Rica in Terrassa as the opponents prepared for the upcoming World Cup.

Career statistics

References

External links

1981 births
Living people
People from Reus
Sportspeople from the Province of Tarragona
Spanish footballers
Footballers from Catalonia
Association football wingers
Association football forwards
La Liga players
Segunda División players
Segunda División B players
Tercera División players
Novelda CF players
UE Tàrrega players
CF Reus Deportiu players
Real Zaragoza B players
Real Zaragoza players
Ciudad de Murcia footballers
Hércules CF players
Rayo Vallecano players
Granada CF footballers
Cypriot First Division players
AEL Limassol players
Super League Greece players
PAS Lamia 1964 players
Athlitiki Enosi Larissa F.C. players
Indian Super League players
Jamshedpur FC players
Catalonia international footballers
Spanish expatriate footballers
Expatriate footballers in Cyprus
Expatriate footballers in Greece
Expatriate footballers in India
Spanish expatriate sportspeople in Cyprus
Spanish expatriate sportspeople in Greece
Spanish expatriate sportspeople in India